Ramon Berndroth (born 24 March 1952) is a German football manager.

Managerial career
Norbert Meier was sacked as manager of SV Darmstadt 98 and Berndroth became the interim manager on 5 December 2016. His first match was a 1–0 loss to SC Freiburg on 10 December 2016. Berndroth ended up losing all three matches as interim manager. He left Darmstadt on 21 December 2016.

References

1952 births
Living people
German football managers
VfB Lübeck managers
Kickers Offenbach managers
FSV Frankfurt managers
Bundesliga managers
SV Darmstadt 98 managers
German footballers
Association football midfielders
VfR Bürstadt players
Eintracht Frankfurt II players
Sportspeople from Mainz